Lioconcha castrensis, common name the zigzag venus, is a species of saltwater clam, a marine bivalve mollusc in the family Veneridae, the venus clams.

Description
The shell of Lioconcha castrensis reaches a maximum length of about 55 mm; it is the largest species in the genus Lioconcha. The shape of the shell is trigonal ovate, with a subtruncated posterior margin and a rounded ventral and anterior margin. This species is equivalve. The valves are quite thick and show fine wrinkled growth lines. This species has a wide range of variations. Usually the shell has blue-black to tan zigzag lines and chestnut-brown blotches on a generally white background. The interior is white.

Distribution
This species has a wide Indo-West Pacific distribution.

References
 Huber M. (2010) Compendium of bivalves. A full-color guide to 3,300 of the world’s marine bivalves. A status on Bivalvia after 250 years of research. Hackenheim: ConchBooks. 901 pp., 1

External links
 Van der Meij S.E.T., Moolenbeek R.G. & Dekker H. (2010) The Lioconcha castrensis species group (Bivalvia: Veneridae), with the description of two new species. Molluscan Research 30(3): 117-124
 WoRMS
 Encyclopedia of life
 Ebivalvia

Veneridae
Molluscs described in 1758
Taxa named by Carl Linnaeus